is a town located in Ashikita District, Kumamoto Prefecture, Japan.

, the town has an estimated population of 4,574 and a density of 130 persons per km2. The total area is 33.97 km2.

Residents of Tsunagi were among those affected by Minamata disease. There is also a tradition of biwa-playing in Tsunagi.

See also 
 2020 Kyushu floods

References

External links

Tsunagi official website 

Towns in Kumamoto Prefecture